Skydiggers/Cash Brothers is a CD by the Canadian bands Skydiggers and The Cash Brothers, released in 2006.

The CD evolved from a series of collaborative shows played by the two bands in the fall and winter of 2005 and 2006. The bands have had a long and extensive shared history — Peter Cash is a former member of Skydiggers, and Andrew Cash was a frequent collaborator with the band in their early years of performing.

Track listing
 I Know You Lie Awake (A. Cash/P. Cash)
 Smile Me Down (A. Cash)
 Overcast and Grey (Finlayson/Maize/Jamieson)
 Maybe Some Day (A. Cash/P. Cash)
 I'm Coming Home (A. Cash/P. Cash)
 Heart-a-Pounding (A. Cash/P. Cash)
 Barely Made it Through (A. Cash/P. Cash)
 Only Now (Finlayson/Maize)
 Falling Down (A. Cash/P. Cash)
 From Down the Line (Finlayson/Maize)
 Nowhere to Go But Up (A. Cash/P. Cash)
 An Honest Day's Work (Finlayson/Maize)

2006 albums
Skydiggers albums
The Cash Brothers albums